Senator McLaurin may refer to:

Anselm J. McLaurin (1848–1909), U.S. Senator from Mississippi from 1894 to 1895
Gene McLaurin (fl. 1990s–2010s), North Carolina State Senate
John L. McLaurin (1860–1934), U.S. Senator from South Carolina from 1897 to 1903